LatinNews (Latin American Newsletters) provides news services relating to Latin America. Its major publications include the Latin American Weekly Report (weekly), Latin American Economy and Business (monthly) and Latinnews Daily (daily).

References

News agencies based in the United Kingdom
Publishing companies established in 1967
Companies based in the London Borough of Camden
1967 establishments in England